The Mayor of Pétange is the mayor of the Luxembourgian commune of Pétange.

List of Mayors of Pétange

Footnotes

References
  Tableau chronologique des bourgmestre de la commune de Pétange.  Pétange official website.  Retrieved on 2016-03-12.

 
Petange